Mossey is an English surname. Notable people with the surname include:

Luke Mossey (born 1992), British motorcycle rider
Neil Mossey, British comedy writer and television producer

See also
Massey (surname)
Mosse
Mossy (disambiguation)

English-language surnames